Saejeol Station is a railway station on Line 6 of the Seoul Subway. It was originally planned to be called Sinsa Station, but the name was changed due to possible confusion with the pre-existing Sinsa station in Gangnam-gu, on Line 3.

Station layout

Exits
 Exit 1: Eungam Post Office
 Exit 2: Wasangyo, Daerim Market
 Exit 3: Yeonseo Middle School
 Exit 4: Sinsa Elementary School

References 

Metro stations in Eunpyeong District
Seoul Metropolitan Subway stations
Railway stations opened in 2000